The Madpur railway station in the Indian state of West Bengal, serves Madpur, India in Paschim Medinipur district. It is on the Howrah–Kharagpur line.

History
Madpur railway station is situated in Kharagpur, West Bengal. Station code is MPD. It is a small railway station between Howrah and Kharagpur. Neighbourhood stations are Jakpur and Shyam Chak and near by major railway station is Kharagpur Jn. Local EMU trains Howrah–Kharagpur local, Santragachi–Kharagpur local, Kharagpur–Howrah local, Kharagpur–Santragachi local, Howrah–Midnapore Local train stop here. The Howrah–Kharagpur line was opened in 1900. The Howrah–Kharagpur stretch has three lines. There is a plan to build a fourth line for the Santragachi–Panskura–Kharagpur stretch.
The Howrah–Kharagpur line was electrified in 1967–69.

References

External links
Trains at Madpur
 

Railway stations in Paschim Medinipur district
Kolkata Suburban Railway stations